Mary Winefride Bousted ( Bleasdale; born 15 September 1959) is a British trade unionist who is the Joint General-Secretary of the National Education Union (NEU) alongside Kevin Courtney. Bousted was formerly General Secretary of the teachers' union, the Association of Teachers and Lecturers (ATL) prior to its amalgamation with the National Union of Teachers, forming the NEU.

Early life
Bousted is the daughter of Edward and Winefride (Lee) Bleasdale.
She was the second-youngest of eight children. Her mother was also a teacher, and supported the Labour Party. Her father supported the Liberals, and was determined for those at the primary school to pass the eleven-plus (the tests used in England and Northern Ireland to determine admission to selective secondary schools). Bousted attended St Osmund's RC Primary School in Breightmet, where her father was the headmaster. She then went to a Roman Catholic girls' direct grant grammar school, Mount St Joseph School. 

Bousted attended the University of Hull, gaining a BA in English. From the University of Durham (Collingwood College), she gained a PGCE. From the UCL Institute of Education she gained an MA. Later from the University of York she gained a PhD.

Career
Bousted taught English from 1982 to 1987 at Bentley Wood High School in Harrow. From 1988 to 1991 she was Head of English at Whitmore High School in Harrow.

From 1991 to 1995, she was a lecturer at the University of York, becoming Director of Initial Teacher Training from 1995 to 1997.

From 1997 to 1999, she was Head of Secondary Education at Edge Hill College, (which became Edge Hill University in 2006), then at the School of Education at Kingston University from 1999 to 2003.

In July 2010, Bousted was awarded an honorary doctorate by Edge Hill University.

In September 2016, she was elected as President of the Trades Union Congress for 2016/17.

She became General Secretary of the ATL in 2003.

References

External links
 ATL profile
 
 ACAS profile
 Devey's educational background
 Mary Bousted profile, The Guardian; accessed 4 February 2022.

Video clips
 Daily Politics June 2011

1959 births
Living people
Schoolteachers from Greater Manchester
Alumni of the University of Hull
Alumni of the University of York
Alumni of the UCL Institute of Education
Academics of the University of York
Academics of Kingston University
Trade unionists from Greater Manchester
General Secretaries of the Association of Teachers and Lecturers
Members of the General Council of the Trades Union Congress
People from Bolton
Presidents of the Trades Union Congress
Women trade unionists
Alumni of Collingwood College, Durham